Virginia McGrath (born 13 March 1965) is an Irish equestrian. She competed at the 1996 Summer Olympics and the 2000 Summer Olympics.

References

External links
 

1965 births
Living people
Irish female equestrians
Olympic equestrians of Ireland
Equestrians at the 1996 Summer Olympics
Equestrians at the 2000 Summer Olympics
Sportspeople from London